Anna May Watson is a fictional character, a supporting character of Spider-Man.

Publication history
The character, created by Stan Lee and Steve Ditko, first appeared in The Amazing Spider-Man #15. Her first appearance helped foreshadow the first appearance of Mary Jane Watson as Mary Jane would be referenced as the niece of Anna.

Fictional character biography 
Anna Watson is depicted as Mary Jane Watson's aunt, an old friend of Aunt May, and a recurring character in various Spider-Man titles. She is depicted as filling the same role of surrogate mother in Mary Jane's life as May does for Peter Parker. For a period of time when May was believed to be dead, she moved in with Peter and Mary Jane. While initially very supportive of her niece's husband, she becomes suspicious with Peter's long absences and unreliability occasionally.

In other media
 Anna Watson appears in the 1994 Spider-Man TV series, voiced by Majel Barrett. She continuously voices her disapproval of Peter Parker due to his absences and his attraction for danger.
 Anna Watson appears in the TV series The Spectacular Spider-Man, voiced by Kath Soucie. Much like the comics, she colludes with May to have Peter and Mary Jane meet.
 Anna Watson is mentioned in the Marvel's Spider-Man episode "Horizon High".

References 

Comics characters introduced in 1964
Fictional characters from New York City
Spider-Man characters
Characters created by Stan Lee
Characters created by Steve Ditko
Marvel Comics female characters